The South Australian Football Hall of Fame enshrines those who have made a most significant contribution to the game of Australian Football.

The Hall of Fame was established in 2002 when 114 outstanding individuals became inaugural inductees.

Since then, the contributions of other players, administrators, media representatives and umpires have been added to this prestigious roll of honour... To be eligible for hall of fame award a player must have been retired from football for at least three years.

2002
113 inductees:

 John Abley
 John Acraman
 Brenton Adcock
 Merv Agars
 Michael Aish
 Ken Aplin
 Paul Bagshaw
 Alby Bahr
 Barrie Barbary
 Fred Bills
 Malcolm Blight
 Dave Boyd
 Don Brebner
 Haydn Bunton, Jr
 John Cahill
 Peter Carey
 Colin Churchett
 Graham Cornes
 Allan Crabb
 Neil Craig
 John Daly
 Tony Daly
 Peter Darley
 Neil Davies
 Rick Davies
 Robert Day
 Les Dayman
 Jim Deane
 Murray Ducker

 Russell Ebert
 Ken Eustice
 Tim Evans
 Brian Faehse
 Ken Farmer
 Grantley Fielke
 Len Fitzgerald
 Des Foster
 Percy Furler
 Frank Golding
 Michael Graham
 John Halbert
 Bob Hammond
 Jim Handby
 Bob Hank
 Neville Hayes
 Lindsay Head
 Richard Head
 Ned Hender
 Thomas Hill
 Kym Hodgeman
 Sampson Hosking
 Laurie Jervis
 George Johnston
 Neil Kerley
 Stephen Kernahan
 Ron Kneebone
 Ray Kutcher
 Tom Leahy

 Bob Lee
 Percy Lewis
 Alick Lill
 Don Lindner
 Tom MacKenzie
 Peter Marker
 Frank Marlow
 John Marriott
 Chris McDermott
 Bruce McGregor
 Tony McGuinness
 Ian McKay
 Bob McLean
 Peter Mead
 Mark Mickan
 Hugh Millard
 Dan Moriarty
 Geof Motley
 Max Murdy
 Mark Naley
 Michael Nunan
 Jack Oatey
 Robert Oatey
 Doug Olds
 Harold Oliver
 Jack Owens
 Dennis Phillis
 Greg Phillips
 Ron Phillips

 John Platten
 Jeff Potter
 Bob Quinn
 John Quinn
 Michael Redden
 Dinny Reedman
 Colin Richens
 Don Roach
 Barrie Robran
 Len Sallis
 Rick Schoff
 Gordon Schwartz
 Walter Scott
 Ralph Sewer
 Bob Shearman
 Bernie Smith
 Laurie Sweeney
 Michael Taylor
 Jack Tredrea
 Frank Tully
 Topsy Waldron
 Bill Wedding
 Paul Weston
 Ted Whelan
 Syd White
 Fos Williams
 John Woods

2003
10 inductees:

2004
10 inductees:

2005
Eight inductees:

2006
Eight inductees:

2007
10 inductees:

2008
Five inductees:
 Geoff Kingston
 Nigel Smart
 Doug Thomas
 Keith Thomas
 Peter Woite

2010
Eight inductees:
 Josh Francou
 John 'Snowy' Hamilton
 Horrie Riley
 Mostyn Rutter
 Bill Sanders
 Terry Von Bertouch
 Ernest Wadham
 Bruce Winter

2012
Eleven inductees:
K. G. Cunningham
Kevin Duggan
Simon Goodwin
Ben Hart
Garry McIntosh
Andrew McLeod
Don McSweeny
Mark Ricciuto
Warren Tredrea
Gavin Wanganeen
Richard Williams

2014
Ten inductees:
Laurie Cahill
Chad Cornes
Tyson Edwards
Phil Gallagher
Chris Gowans
James Gowans
Darel Hart
Tony Modra
Tim Pfeiffer
Matthew Primus

2015
Five inductees:
 Tim Ginever
 Brett James
 Rodney Maynard
 John Paynter
 Leigh Whicker

2016
Five inductees:
 Brenton Phillips
 Roger James
 Stephen Williams
 John Wynne
 Brian Sando

2017
Three inductees:

 Stuart Palmer
 Michael O'Loughlin
 John Condon

2018
Three inductees:

 Peter Vivian
 Darren Smith
 Harry Kernahan

2019
Three inductees:
 Peter Motley
 Greg Anderson
 W. (Bill) Mayman

References

Hall
Australian rules football museums and halls of fame
Awards established in 2002
Halls of fame in Australia
2002 establishments in Australia
Australian rules football-related lists
South Australia-related lists